Circanota simplex is a species of moth of the family Tortricidae. It is found in Panama and Ecuador, at altitudes between sea level and 600 meters.

The length of the forewings is about 6 mm for males and 7–8 mm for females. The forewings are fawn brown mixed throughout with pale orange brown, with faint, narrow, variable traces of slightly darker post-median and subterminal facia and a few short darker markings along the costa. The hindwings are uniform dark grey brown. Adults have been recorded on wing in May.

Etymology
The species name refers to the simple, unmodified features of the genitalia as compared with those of Circanota undulata.

References

Moths described in 2014
Sparganothini